Sõprus ('Friendship') is a cinema in Tallinn, Estonia.

The building was built in 1955 and it was designed by Peeter Tarvas and August Volberg; interior was designed by Maia Laul. At the beginning, the building's had two halls: so-called red and white hall, both had 396 seats. In 1990s, only one hall was used by the cinema. In 2004, the hall had 282 seats.

References

External links
 
Kino Sõprus Tallinnas at Museum of Estonian Architecture

Cinemas in Estonia
Buildings and structures in Tallinn
1955 establishments in Estonia
Tallinn Old Town